Löbenberg is a mountain of Saxony, southeastern Germany.

Geology  
Like the other mountains in the Hohburg area, the Löbenberg, the highest of these elevations, is of volcanic origin. Its age is estimated at around 280 million years. During the ice ages, the hilltop was ground down to its current round shape. It consists mostly of quartz porphyry, which was mined in several quarries from the mid-19th century to the early 1960s for use as paving stones and gravel.

References 

Mountains of Saxony